The Aero Designs Pulsar is an American two-seat, low wing, ultralight  and homebuilt aircraft that was designed by Mark Brown and first produced by Aero Designs of San Antonio, Texas, introduced in 1985. When it was available the Pulsar was supplied as a ready-to-fly aircraft and as a kitplane for amateur construction.

The aircraft was later produced by Skystar Aircraft of Nampa, Idaho and then by Pulsar Aircraft of El Monte, California. Each subsequent manufacturer introduced new variants.

Design and development
The Pulsar was a development of the Star-Lite Aircraft Star Lite and features a cantilever low-wing, a two-seats-in-side-by-side configuration open cockpit under a bubble canopy, fixed tricycle landing gear or optionally conventional landing gear with wheel pants and a single engine in tractor configuration.

The aircraft is made from composites.

The manufacturer estimated the construction time from the supplied kit as 1000 hours.

Operational history
In March 2014 130 examples were registered in the United States with the Federal Aviation Administration, although a total of 195 had been registered at one time. In March 2014 five were registered with Transport Canada and 29 with the CAA in the United Kingdom.

Variants

Pulsar
Original model, powered by a  Rotax 532 two-stroke powerplant and introduced in 1985 by Aero Designs.
Pulsar XP (also called the XP912)
Improved model, with higher gross weight, powered by an  Rotax 912UL four-stroke powerplant and introduced in 1992 by Aero Designs.
Pulsar Series II
Improved model, powered by a  Rotax 912ULS four-stroke or  Rotax 914 turbocharged powerplant and produced by SkyStar Aircraft.
Pulsar III
Improved model, powered by a  Rotax 912UL four-stroke or  Jabiru 2200 powerplant, tricycle landing gear or conventional landing gear and produced by Pulsar Aircraft starting in 1989. A total of 500 kits were claimed to have been delivered by 2005.
Pulsar SP100
Super Pulsar introduced in 2001, powered by an  Rotax 912UL four-stroke or  Jabiru 3300 powerplant, Continental or Lycoming engines, produced by Pulsar Aircraft.

Specifications (Pulsar Series II)

References

External links

Pulsar
1980s United States sport aircraft
1980s United States ultralight aircraft
1980s United States civil utility aircraft
Single-engined tractor aircraft
Low-wing aircraft
Homebuilt aircraft